The Columbus Pawnees were a minor league baseball team based in Columbus, Nebraska. From 1910 to 1915, Columbus teams played exclusively as members of the Class D level Nebraska State League for their six seasons of minor league play. The Pawnees played in the 1914 and 1915 seasons, being preceded by the Columbus "Discovers." After placing 2nd in their first season, Columbus did not finish above 4th place in their remaining seasons, before the franchise folded during the 1915 season.

History
In 1910, minor league baseball began in Columbus, Nebraska. The Columbus Discoverers became charter members of the reformed eight–team Class D level Nebraska State League. The Fremont Pathfinders, Grand Island Collegians, Hastings Brickmakers, Kearney Kapitalists, Red Cloud, Seward Statesmen and Superior Brickmakers joined Columbus in League play. The 1910 Nebraska State League set a salary limit of $900.00 and a roster limit of 12 players.

Sunday laws were in place in the region in the era. A meeting at the Congregational Church in Columbus reportedly occurred on April 29, 1910 to discuss the issue. With about 50 men attending the meeting, it was reported that about 15 were against Sunday baseball and the rest were in favor of playing Sunday baseball in Columbus. Rev. William Dibble of the Congregational church, D Roush of the First Methodist Church and William Hackerman of the German Methodist Church represented local clergy and Columbus Discoverers team president Dan Schram represented the team at the meeting. The franchise indicated that they located the baseball park in a less than ideal area, so crowd and noise would not impact any of the residential areas of the town. County attorney Hensley was not opposed to playing baseball on Sunday. It was concluded that Sunday ball would not face organized opposition and the Nebraska State League scheduled Sunday games for Columbus.

In their first season of minor league play, the 1910 Columbus Discoverers placed 2nd in the final Nebraska State League standings. The Discoverers ended the season with a record of 59–48, playing under manager Joe Norman. Columbus finished the season 4.5 games behind the 1st place Fremont Pathfinders in the final standings of the eight–team league.

In the 1911 season, the Columbus Discoverers continued play in the Class D level Nebraska State League. Columbus ended the season with a record of 52–60 to place 6th in the standings, playing under returning manager Joe Norman Columbus. The local paper noted attendance of 1,000 for the opening game, as the town had a population of about 5,000. Columbus finished 19.0 games behind the 1st place Superior Brickmakers in the final standings of the eight–team league.

The 1912 Columbus Discoverers placed 4th in the final eight–team Nebraska State League standings. With a record of 56–54, playing under managers Jack Palmer and Affie Wilson, the Discoverers finished 11.5 games behind the 1st place Hastings Brickmakers.

In 1913 Columbus Discoverers had a final regular season record of 54–58 to finish in 6th place in the eight–team Nebraska State League. Playing under managers John Gondling, Red Smyth and Jack Kraninger, Columbus finished 13.0 games behind the 1st place Kearney Kapitalists in the final Nebraska State League standings.

The 1914 Columbus "Pawnees" placed 7th in the eight–team Nebraska State League final standings. With a record of 49–63 under manager Jack Kraninger, the Pawnees finished 17.0 games behind the 1st place Grand Island Islanders in the Nebraska State League standings.

The Columbus, Nebraska use of the "Pawnee" moniker corresponds to the Pawnee Indian tribe that was from the region. Today, Pawnee Park is still in use as a public park in Columbus, opened in 1941.

In their final season of minor league play, the 1915 Columbus Pawnees folded during the season. On June 4, 1915, the Columbus Pawnees and the Kearney Buffaoles both disbanded on the same day. At the time the franchise folded, Columbus had a record of 3–13 under manager Frank Justus. The Nebraska State League folded on July 18, 1915 with the Beatrice Milkskimmers in 1st place after four teams of the eight–team league had folded.

Columbus, Nebraska has not hosted another minor league team.

The ballpark
The name of the Columbus minor league teams' home ballpark is not directly referenced. In 1883, the "Columbus Athletic Association" was reportedly formed. The purpose of the association was said to be "to construct and maintain suitable grounds, buildings and the like for the holding and encouraging of games of baseball and all other athletics."

Timeline

Year–by–year record

Notable alumni

Joe Dolan (1910)
Jack Ferry (1914)
Raymond Haley (1910)
Moxie Meixell (1910–1911)
Red Smyth (1913, MGR)

See also
Columbus Discoverers playersColumbus Pawnees players

References

External links
Baseball Reference

Defunct minor league baseball teams
Defunct baseball teams in Nebraska
Professional baseball teams in Nebraska
Baseball teams established in 1914
Baseball teams disestablished in 1915
Nebraska State League teams
Platte County, Nebraska